

271001–271100 

|-id=009
| 271009 Reitterferenc ||  || Ferenc Reitter (1813–1874), a Hungarian architect and engineer || 
|}

271101–271200 

|-bgcolor=#f2f2f2
| colspan=4 align=center | 
|}

271201–271300 

|-id=216
| 271216 Boblambert ||  || Bob Lambert (born 1943), is an amateur astronomer, community educator, and a founder of the McCarthy Observatory. He oversaw the creation of the Observatory's Galileo's Garden, a place for contemplation and teaching. A proponent of science literacy and educational excellence, he has observed this minor planet. || 
|-id=235
| 271235 Bellay ||  || Joachim du Bellay (1522–1560), a French poet || 
|}

271301–271400 

|-bgcolor=#f2f2f2
| colspan=4 align=center | 
|}

271401–271500 

|-bgcolor=#f2f2f2
| colspan=4 align=center | 
|}

271501–271600 

|-bgcolor=#f2f2f2
| colspan=4 align=center | 
|}

271601–271700 

|-bgcolor=#f2f2f2
| colspan=4 align=center | 
|}

271701–271800 

|-id=763
| 271763 Hebrewu ||  || The Hebrew University of Jerusalem, often abbreviated as Hebrew U, one of the top research universities in the world || 
|}

271801–271900 

|-bgcolor=#f2f2f2
| colspan=4 align=center | 
|}

271901–272000 

|-bgcolor=#f2f2f2
| colspan=4 align=center | 
|}

References 

271001-272000